The National Security Agency is a United States government agency.

National Security Agency may also refer to:

National Security Agency (Afghanistan)
National Security Agency (Bahrain)
National Security Agency (Egypt)
National Security Agency (Liberia)
National Security Agency (Montenegro)
Intelligence Bureau (India)
National Investigation Agency (India)

See also
State Security Agency (disambiguation)
National Intelligence Agency (disambiguation)
Defence Intelligence Agency (disambiguation)
Security Bureau (disambiguation)
National Bureau of Investigation (disambiguation)